State Route 511 (SR 511) was a short state highway that followed West Washington Street in Carson City, Nevada. It was turned over to local control in 2010.

Route description
The highway began at the intersection of West Washington Street and Ormsby Boulevard (SR 516) in a western residential area of Carson City.

History
State Route 511 was designated a state highway by 1983.

A proposal to transfer ownership of several state highways, including SR 511, to Carson City had surfaced by 2007. This action was taken to reduce the city's financial obligation to the Nevada Department of Transportation for constructing the Carson City Freeway (future Interstate 580). By January 2010, State Route 511 had been removed from the state highway system.

References

511